Creatine kinase S-type, mitochondrial is an enzyme that in humans is encoded by the CKMT2 gene.

Mitochondrial creatine kinase (MtCK) is responsible for the transfer of high energy phosphate from mitochondria to the cytosolic carrier, creatine. The "energy-rich" gamma-phosphate group of ATP that is generated by oxidative phosphorylation inside mitochondria is trans-phosphorylated to creatine (Cr) to give phospho-creatine (PCr), which then is exported from the mitochondria into the cytosol, where it is made available to cytosolic creatine kinases (CK) for in situ regeneration of the ATP that has been used for cellular work. Cr then is returning to the mitochondria where it stimulates mitochondrial respiration and again is charged-up by mitochondrial ATP via MtCK. This process is termed the PCr/Cr-shuttle or circuit. 
MtCK belongs to the creatine kinase (CK) isoenzyme family. It exists as two isoenzymes, sarcomeric MtCK and ubiquitous MtCK, encoded by separate genes. Mitochondrial creatine kinase occurs in two different oligomeric forms: dimers and octamers, in contrast to the exclusively dimeric cytosolic creatine kinase isoenzymes. Sarcomeric mitochondrial creatine kinase has 80% homology with the coding exons of ubiquitous mitochondrial creatine kinase. This gene contains sequences homologous to several motifs that are shared among some nuclear genes encoding mitochondrial proteins and thus may be essential for the coordinated activation of these genes during mitochondrial biogenesis.

References

External links

Further reading